Rafic Charaf (Baalbek, Lebanon, 1932 – Beirut 2003) was a Lebanese painter. He studied at the Académie Libanaise des Beaux-Arts ALBA and, in 1955, obtained a scholarship from the Spanish government and went at the Real Academia de Bellas Artes de San Fernando in Madrid before returning to Lebanon.

Life and work
Grown up in a poor neighborhood, Charaf pioneered an expressionistic style of painting, covering a range of themes including contemporary political issues, social struggles of his native Baalbek and folk art and poetry.

Charaf appeared as a visionary and pessimistic artist when, in the early 1960s, he depicted lugubrious landscapes, often outfitted by wires and dead trees.  He always showed social and political involvement in his art, so that when the Lebanese Civil War broke up, he produced posters devoted to the National Resistance. Charaf eventually made during this period more personal drawings in which he interpreted his feelings about the tragedy that shook his country. Two of these drawings were part of The Road to Peace,  an exhibition Saleh Barakat curated in 2009 at the Beirut Art Center, encompassing Lebanese visual arts between 1975 and 1991. In the years following the beginning of the war, Charaf will drift into an opposite direction, working with gold leaf on icons inspired by Byzantine and Oriental religious mosaics and paintings.

Rafic Charaf always showed interest on popular culture from his native region and elsewhere in the region. Inspired by oral history and folklore, he created a series of paintings depicting the epics of the Arab poet and hero Antar and his cousin, Abla, with whom he fell in love and married her.

Selected exhibitions

Solo exhibitions
 Body and Space, Planula Elissar, Beirut, 1981
 Antar wa Abla, Galerie Damo, Antelias, Lebanon, 1978
 Charaf, Contact Gallery, Beirut, 1975
 Charaf, Contact Gallery, Beirut, 1974
 Of Men and Horses, Contact Gallery, Beirut, 1973
 Forgotten Land, Carlton Hotel, Beirut, 1964
 Unesco Palace, 1961

Group exhibitions

Baalbek, Archives of an Eternity, Sursock Museum, 2019
 Art from Lebanon, Beirut Exhibition Center, 2012
 De Lumière et de Sang, Foundation Audi, Beirut, 2010
 The Road to Peace, Beirut Art Center, 2009
 Landscapes.Cityscapes.1 – Maqam Art Gallery, Beirut, 2009
 Biennale de Paris, 1965
 3rd Unesco Salon, Beirut, 1955

Awards
 Prix de l’Ile de France, 1963
 Ministry of Education of Lebanon, 1st Prize, 1959

References

External links
Official website
Rafic Charaf at the Mokbel Art Collection

1932 births
2003 deaths
20th-century Lebanese painters